Evan Cooper (born June 28, 1962) is a former American football player. He played college football as a defensive back at the University of Michigan from 1980 to 1983.  He played professional football in the National Football League (NFL) as a safety for the Philadelphia Eagles from 1984 to 1987 and the Atlanta Falcons from 1988 to 1989.

Early years
Cooper was born in Miami, Florida, in 1962.  He attended Killian High School in the Kendall area of Miami, Florida.

University of Michigan
Cooper enrolled at the University of Michigan in 1980 and played college football as a defensive back and punt returner for head coach Bo Schembechler's Michigan Wolverines football teams from 1980 to 1983. He started four games at cornerback in 1981, 12 games at free safety in 1982, and 12 games at strong and free safety in 1983. He was selected by the Associated Press as a first-team All-Big Ten defensive back in 1983.  In his four years at Michigan, Cooper recorded 129 tackles, 12 pass breakups, 10 interceptions, and 100 interception return yards. He also returned 40 punts for 428 yards, an average of 10.7 yards per return.

Professional football
Cooper was selected by the Philadelphia Eagles in the fourth round (88th overall pick) of the 1984 NFL Draft. During the 1984 and 1985 seasons, the Eagles used him as a punt returner. During those two seasons, he returned 83 punts for 614 yards, an average of 7.4 yards per return. He also returned 20 kickoffs for 331 yards, an average of 16.6 yards per return. In 1985, he started 13 games for the Eagles at the right cornerback position.

In 1988, Cooper joined the Atlanta Falcons.  He was a kick returner during the 1988 season, returning two punts and 16 kickoffs.  He concluded his playing career in 1989 with the Falcons, starting 13 games at the strong safety position. He intercepted four passes and had 54 interception return yards during the 1989 season.

References

1962 births
Living people
American football safeties
Atlanta Falcons players
Michigan Wolverines football players
Philadelphia Eagles players
Miami Killian Senior High School alumni
Players of American football from Miami